Fatty and Minnie He-Haw is a 1914 American short comedy film directed by and starring Roscoe Arbuckle.

Cast
 Roscoe 'Fatty' Arbuckle as Fatty
 Minnie Devereaux as Minnie He-Haw
 Edward Dillon (as Eddie Dillon)
 Minta Durfee as Minta
 Frank Hayes as Old man at saloon
 Harry McCoy as Barfly
 Slim Summerville as Railroad employee
 Josef Swickard as Minta's father

See also
 List of American films of 1914
 Fatty Arbuckle filmography

References

External links

1914 films
Films directed by Roscoe Arbuckle
Films produced by Mack Sennett
1914 comedy films
1914 short films
American silent short films
American black-and-white films
Silent American comedy films
Keystone Studios films
American comedy short films
1910s American films
1910s English-language films